Nanxiang may refer to the following locations in China:

 Nanxiang, Heng County (南乡镇), town in Guangxi
 Nanxiang, Hezhou (南乡镇), town in Babu District, Hezhou, Guangxi
 Nanxiang (南翔镇), town in Jiading District, Shanghai